Amilo may refer to:
 Amilo, Azamgarh, a census town in Azamgarh district, Uttar Pradesh, India
 Amilo, Varanasi, a village in Varanasi district, Uttar Pradesh, India
 Amilo, a notebook computer manufactured by Fujitsu Siemens Computers

See also 
 Amilos, a settlement in ancient Arcadia, Greece